A sequence step algorithm (SQS-AL) is an algorithm implemented in a discrete event simulation system to maximize resource utilization. This is achieved by running through two main nested loops: A sequence step loop and a replication loop. For each sequence step, each replication loop is a simulation run that collects crew idle time for activities in that sequence step. The collected crew idle times are then used to determine resource arrival dates for user-specified confidence levels. The process of collecting the crew idle times and determining crew arrival times for activities on a considered sequence step is repeated from the first to the last sequence step.

See also
 Computational resource
 Linear scheduling method

References

Further reading
 Photios G. Ioannou and Chachrist Srisuwanrat Sequence Step Algorithm for Continuous Resource Utilization in Probabilistic Repetitive Projects
 Chachrist Srisuwanrat and Photios G. Ioannou The Investigation of Lead-Time Buffering under Uncertainty Using Simulation and Cost Optimization

Scheduling algorithms
Network theory